Care.com is an online marketplace for childcare, senior care, special needs care, tutoring, pet care, and housekeeping through membership in a two-sided marketplace. The firm is based in Austin, Texas, with offices in Berlin, Germany.

The site has 32.9 million subscribers from 20 different countries.
Care.com is also provided as an employee perk by 150 firms and organisations, including Google and Facebook.

The company raised $111 million in venture funding before going public on January 24, 2014. Care.com was bought by IAC in February 2020 and is no longer publicly traded.

History
Sheila Lirio Marcelo, who helped start the college savings site Upromise and was vice-president and general manager of TheLadders.com, came up with the idea for Care.com when she had trouble finding someone to help care for her first child.  Then her father had a heart attack while he was caring for her second child, and she had difficulty finding care for him in addition to child care.

Between October 2006 and the end of 2012, Care.com received $111 million in funding from investors including Matrix Partners, Trinity Ventures, New Enterprise Associates, USAA, and Institutional Venture Partners (IVP). Immediately prior to founding Care.com Marcelo was an Entrepreneur in residence at Matrix Partners, where she met with the founders of Sittercity.com and another website for finding caregivers, to discuss a potential investment and bringing Marcelo in as CEO. Matrix Partners did not invest in either firm and, months later, Marcelo founded Care.com and received $3.5 million in Series A funding from Matrix Partners, with Reid Hoffman, co-founder of LinkedIn also participating in that round. The Boston Globe reported on several allegations that Marcelo had met with other companies in order to use the information for starting Care.com. A spokesperson for Matrix responded denied any claims of "unfair treatment".

When Care.com launched in 2007, it helped customers find babysitters, tutors, pet care and senior care.  The site also offers other services, such as housekeeping and care for special needs children and adults. As basic members, users may browse, post jobs, and see select caregiver profiles for free, or they can enrol as premium members and pay a monthly, quarterly, or yearly membership fee to have full access to the site and all carers. For a monthly subscription, the site also assists users in finding work possibilities in their region by uploading a profile and applying to positions..  The firm provides a babysitting fee calculator to assist parents in determining how much to pay their sitter.

It expanded its online marketplace into the United Kingdom in April 2012,  followed after by Canada. In September 2012, the business launched Karoo, a private mobile social network that links families and carers that was later shut down. Care.com introduced Care.com Recruiting Solutions in December 2012 to assist care-related businesses in hiring carers and filling staff openings through the site. In June 2013, Care.com and Knowledge Universe, a company that runs child care centers throughout the country, announced a partnership, where Care.com corporate clients will have access to KU's facilities for backup care.

In November 2013, Care.com filed for an initial public offering with Morgan Stanley, BofA, Merrill Lynch and J.P. Morgan as the joint book-running managers, and Allen & Company LLC and Stifel as senior co-managers. In December 2013 details of the IPO were first revealed, with January 2014 reports saying that the company planned to raise $85.6 million by offering 5.35 million shares, at $14 to $16 each, on the New York Stock Exchange under the symbol "CRCM". On January 23, 2014, 5.35 million shares were priced at $17. Care.com went public on January 24, 2014, with shares climbing to $22.55, up about 30 percent from its initial pricing. It was the first Boston venture-funded technology company to go public in almost two years.

In 2015, The Boston Globe reported a couple defrauded by a nanny who had cleared the site's background check process as well as other instances where families in the United States were suing the company for alleged negligence in properly conducting background checks, including two where the sitter hired was facing criminal charges over the death of the child they were hired to watch. In March 2019, The Wall Street Journal reported that the site listed day care providers as licensed in their state when they were not, and that in one of the providers two children had drowned and at another, children had been physically and sexually abused. Care.com responded by eliminating unverified childcare listings created automatically but never claimed by the facility owner from the site and strengthening member screening procedures.

In December 2019, IAC announced that it will acquire Care.com for $15 per share, a 13.2% premium over the company's most recent closing price of $13.25, in a deal worth about $500 million. As part of the deal, IAC executive Tim Allen became CEO of Care.com when the acquisition was completed in February 2020, at which point Care.com ceased trading on the NYSE.

Acquisitions

Awards
In 2013, the Care.com app Karoo received a Webby Award under the social (handheld devices) category. The app was later withdrawn.

References

2006 establishments in Massachusetts
Health care companies based in Massachusetts
American companies established in 2006
Health care companies established in 2006
Internet properties established in 2007
2013 initial public offerings
2020 mergers and acquisitions
Companies formerly listed on the New York Stock Exchange
Companies based in Waltham, Massachusetts
American health websites
IAC (company)